is a Japanese footballer who plays for Kashima Antlers in J1 League having previously turned out for J2 League sides Mito Hollyhock and Tokushima Vortis.

Club statistics
Updated to 1 January 2022.

Honours

Club
Yokohama F. Marinos
J1 League (1): 2019

References

External links

Profile at Tokushima Vortis
Profile at Kashima Antlers

1995 births
Living people
Association football people from Saitama Prefecture
Japanese footballers
J1 League players
J2 League players
Mito HollyHock players
Tokushima Vortis players
Yokohama F. Marinos players
Kashima Antlers players
Association football defenders